Abdallah Ali Mohamed (born 11 April 1999) is a Comorian professional footballer who plays as a right-back for Swiss Challenge League club Lausanne Ouchy and the Comoros national team.

Club career
Ali Mohamed was part of the Marseille youth academy from the age of 13.

On 3 July 2021, Ali Mohamed signed with Lausanne Ouchy in Switzerland.

International career
Ali Mohamed debuted for the Comoros national team in a friendly 2–0 loss with Togo on 4 June 2017.

Career statistics

References

External links
 OM Marseille profile
 

Living people
1999 births
People from Moroni, Comoros
French sportspeople of Comorian descent
Comorian footballers
Association football defenders
Comoros international footballers
2021 Africa Cup of Nations players
Olympique de Marseille players
S.V. Zulte Waregem players
FC Stade Lausanne Ouchy players
Championnat National 2 players
Swiss Challenge League players
Comorian expatriate footballers
Expatriate footballers in France
Comorian expatriate sportspeople in France
Expatriate footballers in Belgium
Comorian expatriate sportspeople in Belgium
Expatriate footballers in Switzerland
Comorian expatriate sportspeople in Switzerland